Frank Evers may refer to:

 Frank Evers (cartoonist) (1920–2002), editorial cartoonist
 Frank Evers (Gaelic footballer) (born 1934), Gaelic footballer for the Galway county team in the 1950s and early 1960s
 Frank Evers (businessman) (born 1965), CEO of Institute for Artist Management